Health care license may refer to:
Medical license for physicians
Nurse license for nurses
Any other license for other health care providers, such as optometrists, pharmacists, dentists, clinical laboratory personnel, etc.